Caotan is a town of Huining County, Gansu, China. It has a population of 13,180 as of 2019 and governs over 7 villages. The town is poor and most residents make a living by farming corn, wheat, potato and shallot.

References 

Township-level divisions of Gansu
Baiyin